Mission-type tactics (German: Auftragstaktik, from Auftrag and Taktik; also known as mission command in the United States and the United Kingdom) are military tactics where the emphasis is placed on the outcome of a mission rather than on specific methods. Mission-type tactics have been a central component of German armed forces' military tactics since the 19th century.

The term Auftragstaktik was coined by the tactic's opponents, who preferred Normaltaktiker. In the modern German Army, the Bundeswehr, the term Auftragstaktik is considered to be an incorrect characterization of the concept; instead, Führen mit Auftrag ("leading by mission") is used. However, the older but unofficial term is more widespread.

In mission-type tactics, the military commander gives subordinate leaders a clearly-defined objective, the forces needed to accomplish that objective and a timeframe in which the objective must be accomplished. The subordinate leaders then decide on methods to achieve the objective independently. To a large extent, the subordinate leaders are given the planning initiative and a freedom in execution, which allows a high degree of flexibility at the operational and tactical levels of command. That frees the higher leadership from managing the tactical details.

For the success of the mission-type tactics, the subordinate leaders must understand the orders' intent and be trained to act independently. The success of the doctrine rests upon the subordinates' understanding of the intent of the issuer of the orders issuer and their willingness to achieve the goal even if their actions violate other guidance or received orders.

Taking the risks of violating previously-expressed limitations as a routine step to achieving a mission is a behaviour that is most easily sustained in a particular type of innovative culture, which is today often associated with elite units, rather than an entire army.

Mission-type tactics are advocated but not always used by the chain of command in the US Army, Canadian and the Dutch Army and the British Army.

Mission command is compatible with modern military network-centric concepts, and less-centralised approaches to command and control (C2) in general.

A review and analysis of mission-type tactics in a variety of military establishments is provided by Eitan Shamir.

Etymology 
When it is translated to English, the German word, which has never been part of the official German military's lexicon, loses some of its effect. The German word does not describe a set of tactics per se, and it certainly neither is limited to the tactical level of operations nor a method of leadership. However, it encapsulates a style of command: "tactics focused on accomplishing the task/mission", as opposed to Befehlstaktik ("tactics focused on executing a set of orders"). Direct orders are an exception in the German military, and "tasks" are the standard instrument of leadership from the high command down to the squad level.

Many other terms were used to denote concepts of mission-type tactics in Germany between 1891 and 1914, a few being Freies Verfahren ("free method"), Freie Taktik ("free tactics"), Auftragsverfahren ("mission method"), Individualverfahren ("individual method") and Initiativverfahren ("initiative method"). An excellent discussion of the evolution of the terminology is given by Stephan Leistenschneider.

Characteristics 
For a mission-focused command to succeed, it is crucial that subordinate leaders understand the intent of their orders, are given proper guidance and are trained to act independently.

The obverse is the implicit requirement imposed on superior commanders to give their subordinates no more orders than are essential (every order given is regarded as an additional constraint upon its recipient) and to be extremely rigorous, absolutely clear and very succinct in the expression of their commands.

The success of the doctrine rests upon the recipient of orders understanding the intent of whoever issues the orders and acting to achieve the goal even if their actions violate other guidance or orders they have received. Mission-type tactics assume the possibility of violating other previously-expressed limitations as a step to achieving a mission. They are a concept most easily sustained in a decentralised command culture, which is quite alien to any organisation in which, at every level, a subordinate commander is only expected and therefore trained to follow detailed orders.

That has significant implications for any army considering the adoption of Auftragstaktik. To clarify, the classic German approach called for every commander to be trained to function effectively at two levels of command above his appointment; a platoon commander—an appointment that was, and is, an NCO one in the German Army—would be expected to control battalion actions, if need be.

Some would say that today, such a culture is associated only with elite units, not a whole army. Few armies seem to have mastered the approach. The Wehrmacht are perhaps the premier example, a degree of competence that was achieved only after rigorous training under Hans von Seeckt between 1919 and 1935. Since World War II, only the Israeli Defence Force seems to have come close to matching the Wehrmacht of World War II in the exercise of command in this style partly because of a conscious decision on the part of Moshe Dayan, who fought under British command in World War II and attended a British Army Staff training course that his memoirs state greatly disappointed him.

This style of command originates in a state (Prussia) that saw itself as small, surrounded by enemies and in imminent danger of destruction; the same may be said of Israel. That may offer a clue to the failure of other equally developed armies to adopt this way of exercising command. For example, the British Army in 1987 announced an intention to adopt 'Mission Command', but an internal 2004 British Army review of command and control in the Iraq War in 2003 clearly shows that it had achieved the reverse. British orders were substantially more detailed, and subordinates generally more constrained than twenty years earlier, which indicates that there is more to Auftragstaktik than process.

Origins 
After the severe defeat of the Prussians by Napoleon in 1806 in the Battle of Jena-Auerstedt, the Prussian military rethought their military approach and aimed to build a college of military capability, the General Staff, as a systemic counter to the individual genius that had so soundly beaten them. Napoleon fought a continual battle of movement. Throughout his career, at least until the Peninsular War, he demonstrated his ability to defeat any enemy by the greater flexibility of his units and through better deployment. The fact that French troops were mainly composed of conscripts indicates that it was Napoleon's organization of the troops, rather than their professional training, that gave the French an overall advantage. The institutionalization of excellence within the Prussian Army was to build this same flexibility as well as the other role of the General Staff Officer, which was to make sure each military unit understood and executed its mission.

One of the earliest alleged uses of Auftragstaktik was at the Battle of Königgrätz in the Austro-Prussian War. Auftragstaktik is one of the tools often claimed to have given the Prussians their decisive victory. That claim is difficult to accept since no appreciation of Auftragstaktik had been accepted officially. The Bohemian Campaign could have been an example of its use only if having subordinate commanders that ignore directives from superiors, who march southward when ordered to march east, and treat their senior commanders with barely concealed contempt can truly be described as a form of "flexible command". Most of the Prussian commanders, particularly Frederick Charles of the 1st Prussian Army, had no real understanding of Moltke the Elder's strategy. Frederick Charles did not much like the parts that he understood, was uncooperative under Moltke's orders, and disobeyed him several times. During the battle and without authorisation, he acted on his own initiative and launched a premature attack on the Austrian Army, which nearly ended in disaster. If Crown Prince Frederick William had arrived only an hour later, the battle might have been decisively lost.

After the First World War, the monitoring, coaching and training role built a level of trust, competency and understanding across the whole 4,000-strong German post-war officer corps which made a new level of excellence possible.

Excellence in this case is derived in part from the tradition of Gerhard von Scharnhorst, Carl von Clausewitz and Helmuth von Moltke and was based upon the premise that hard-and-fast rules had no place in the environment of war, which was the realm of human emotion, friction, chance and uncertainty. Moltke is considered one of the principal advocates of independent thinking and acting among his subordinates: Diverse are the situations under which an officer has to act on the basis of his own view of the situation. It would be wrong if he had to wait for orders at times when no orders can be given. But most productive are his actions when he acts within the framework of his senior commander's intent.

Under the Auftragstaktik system, the selection of combat formations, as well as their route and rate of advance, was based upon a unit's mission, the terrain and the enemy's disposition, something Napoleon was renowned for doing. Building a high level of trust, competency and understanding is crucial for the success of such a doctrine. The freedoms that might imply have challenged many armies' views of military discipline, including that of the Prussian Army.

Training 
The force flexibility that underlies this command style poses particular challenges once the new task-oriented formation is created. The creation of combined-arms forces poses particular challenges to command, especially if they are attached during a battle. To that end during and before the Second World War, the German General Staff cross posted officers and non-commissioned officers (NCOs) between the different branches of the army. It was therefore not unusual to find an armour commander with experience of artillery and infantry command. Similarly, NCOs with cross-branch tactical experience ensured that these combined-arms teams did operate in an integrated fashion. The German High Command (OKH) ran multiple exercises, or war games, in the 1930s starting with small operations and in later years involving very large formations and major movements to ensure doctrinal coherence and the opportunity to revise and learn. The General Staff played a vital role in assuring the quality of these exercises and in ensuring that lessons were learnt and much of the philosophy was incorporated in its 1933 Field Manual Truppenführung.

Doctrine 

Doctrine is the conceptual underpinning of how to think and to operate effectively, and teaching leaders what to think is dogma. Doctrine is thus a framework to ensure common understanding and is the basis of training in armies.

A few statements underline the general motivation of Auftragstaktik:

 "Everything in war is very simple but the simplest thing is difficult" (Carl von Clausewitz).
 "No operational plan can, with any degree of safety, go further than the first encounter with the enemy's main force".(Helmuth Karl Bernhard von Moltke, a slightly more colloquial paraphrase is "No plan survives first contact with the enemy").
 "Nothing is enduring, except the change of situation" (common adage of German soldiers).

Thus, Auftragstaktik can be seen as a doctrine within which formal rules can be selectively suspended in order to overcome "friction". Problems will occur with misplaced communications; troops going to the wrong location; delays caused by weather etc.; and, in during battle, successes of the enemy. It is the duty of the commander to do his best to overcome them. Auftragstaktik encourages commanders to exhibit initiative, flexibility and improvisation while in command. Auftragstaktik does not allow a commander to actually disobey orders, but it allows, which may be seen as surprising by some, and even demands for him to consider an order no longer binding if it would not have been given in the changed situation (according to his own judgment. Only the intent of the higher commander must be maintained.

That demands, of course, junior officers and NCOs, which are rarely private ranks, to have the skill and also the self-confidence to treat the order accordingly. A sub-leader whose first fear is to be lectured by his superior cannot bring himself to do anything else with orders than to execute them to the letter; he is not capable of Auftragstaktik. Also, it means that the so-called leader on site (German: "Führer vor Ort"; it has to be determined who that is if, say, soldiers from different units without uniting command structure fight together in one place) becomes rather more important than the vertical chain of command. That is because the leader on site must be obeyed unconditionally (that is, within the bounds of international law, penal law and human dignity). As for higher but absent leaders, it is ultimately in the responsibility of the leader on site to determine whether the situation has changed, but, of course, if he deviates from an order he will have to explain his actions afterward.

There are cases cited during combat in which the operational orders were a copy of orders that had been issued for an earlier operation or training exercise. It is claimed that almost the only thing that has been changed were unit names and locations. That strongly suggests that long experience of operations allowed senior commanders to be quite abstract in their orders, which were issued without great fear of being misunderstood. It also suggests that sequences of moves on quite a large scale were already familiar to the forces involved, which probably improved their execution.

Information Age 
"The paradox of war in the Information Age is one of managing massive amounts of information and resisting the temptation to overcontrol it. The competitive advantage is nullified when you try to run decisions up and down the chain of command. All platoons and tank crews have real-time information on what is going on around them, the location of the enemy, and the nature and targeting of the enemy's weapons system. Once the commander's intent is understood, decisions must be devolved to the lowest possible level to allow these front line soldiers to exploit the opportunities that develop". —General Gordon R. Sullivan, quoted in Delivering Results by David Ulrich.

Effectiveness 
Analysis by the US Army of the 1939 German invasion of Poland found, "The emphasis which the Germans placed on the development of leadership and initiative in commanders during years of preparatory training brought its rewards in the Polish campaign. With confidence that these principles had been properly inculcated, all commanders, from the highest to the lowest echelons, felt free to carry out their missions or meet changes in situations with a minimum of interference by higher commanders". It recognised that "initiative, flexibility and mobility" were the essential aspects of German tactics.

A key aspect of mission-type tactics is forward control. To understand what is happening at the point of action and to be able to take decisions quickly, the operational commander must be able to observe results. The decision to deviate from original plans in pursuit of the mission must be made for 'friction' to be overcome and momentum to be sustained. The impact of the application of personal influence was thought to be critical and to be possible only because of the bench-strength provided by general staff officers managing in the formations' rear.

That aspect is also responsible for the high casualty rate amongst commanders even in successful operations (5% of all of the dead). Heinz Guderian ensured that all German tanks had radio receivers to make his command effective.

The domination of the battlefield, combined with the difficulty of discerning the pattern of the attacker's assault, which used integrated command of combined arms teams, meant that conventional force strategies were rendered ineffective as the "Front seemed to disappear".

See also 
 Blitzkrieg, lightning warfare of World War II
 Infiltration tactics, precursor to blitzkrieg in World War I
 Command and obedience in the Bundeswehr
 Distributed operations
 Intent (military)
 Command by negation

References

External links and further reading 
 Generals Balck And Von Mellenthin On Tactics: Implications For NATO Military Doctrine a 1980 paper where the concept of the Auftragstaktik is explained and demonstrated.
 Werner Widder (de): Auftragstaktik and Innere Führung. Trademarks of German Generalship. In: Military Review (2002), September-October, p. 3–9
 Manuel de Landa, War in the Age of Intelligent Machines, 1991.
 von Luck, Hans. Panzer Commander. Cassell Military, 1991. Available online, accessed 4 October 2005.
 "Auftragstaktik, or Directive Control, in Joint and Combined Operations." Parameters, US Army War College Quarterly. Autumn 1999, Vol. XXIX, No. 3. David M. Keithly and Stephen P. Ferris. Available online, accessed 11 November 2005.
 Gerhard Muhm: German Tactics in the Italian Campaign.
 Gerhard Muhm, "La tattica tedesca nella campagna d'Italia," in Linea gotica avamposto dei Balcani, a cura di Amedeo Montemaggi – Edizioni Civitas, Roma 1993.
  Originally published in German as Heeresdienstvorschrift 300: Part 1 (1933) and Part 2 (1934)..
 Jeremy Tozer, Leading Through Leaders, 2012, Kogan Page, London.
 Stephen Bungay, The Art of Action, 2011, Nicholas Brealey, London.

Military doctrines
Military history of Germany
Command and control